Bayezid II Mosque may refer to:
 Bayezid II Mosque, Istanbul
 Bayezid II Mosque, Amasya

Mosque disambiguation pages